Abū ʿAmr ʿAbd al-Raḥmān ibn ʿAmr al-ʾAwzāʿī  (707–774) was an Islamic scholar, traditionalist and the chief representative and eponym of the ʾAwzāʿī school of Islamic jurisprudence.

Biography

Awzāʿī was probably born in Baalbek (in modern-day Lebanon) in 707. He was referred to by his nisbah Awzā (الأوزاع), part of Banu Hamdan. The biographer and historian Al-Dhahabi reports that Awzāʿī was from Sindh, and he was a mawali of ʾAwzā tribe in his early life. Very little of al-Awzāʿī's writings survive, but his style of Islamic jurisprudence (usul al-fiqh) is preserved in Abu Yusuf's book Al-radd ʿala siyar al-Awzāʿī, in particular his reliance on the "living tradition," or the  uninterrupted practice of Muslims handed down from preceding generations. For Awzāʿī, this was the true Sunnah of Muhammad. Awzāʿī's school flourished in Syria, the Maghreb, and Al Andalus but was eventually overcome and replaced by the Maliki school of Islamic law in the 9th century. He died in 774 and was buried near Beirut, Lebanon, where his tomb is still visited.

Views
Theologically, he was known as a persecutor of the Qadaris, but also one of the main historical witnesses of them. He alleged that the Qadaris merely appropriated heretical doctrines from the Christians.  Awzāʿī had met their founder Maʿbad.

Al-Awzāʿī differed with all the other schools of fiqh in holding that apostates from Islam ought not be executed unless their apostasy is part of a 'plot to take over the State', i.e. treason.

In the introduction to his work al-Jarh wa-l-ta'dil, Ibn Abi Hatim al-Razi (d. 938 (AH 327)) preserves a corpus of ten letters attributed to al-Awzāʿī. In these letters, al-Awzāʿī addresses a series of high ranking officials, in order to plead the cause of individuals and groups. Among other things, he encouraged the Abbasids to ransom Muslims who were captured by the Byzantines in Erzurum, and to increase the wages of the Syrian soldiers in charge of protecting the Levantine coast.

Both Christians and Muslims from the Beirut area appealed to al-Awza'i for help. In one story, a local Christian in Beirut sought al-Awza'i's help in resolving a tax dispute. When his appeal to the kharaj tax administrator failed, al-Awza'i gave the Christian the 80 dinars he thought he was owed, and even tried to return the jar of honey the Christian had given him to thank him for his efforts.

Further reading

References

External links
 Biodata at MuslimScholars.info

707 births
774 deaths
Sunni Muslim scholars of Islam
Atharis
Taba‘ at-Tabi‘in hadith narrators
Religious leaders from Beirut
Scholars from the Umayyad Caliphate
8th-century jurists
8th-century Arabs